The 1993 Volvo International was a tennis tournament played on outdoor hard courts at the Cullman-Heyman Tennis Center in New Haven, Connecticut, United States and was part of the Championship Series of the 1993 ATP Tour. The tournament ran from August 16 through August 23, 1993.  Kelly Jones and Rick Leach were the defending champions but only Jones competed that year with Paul Annacone. Annacone and Jones lost in the semifinals to Cyril Suk and Daniel Vacek. Suk and Vacek won in the final 7–5, 6–4 against Steve DeVries and David Macpherson.

Seeds
Champion seeds are indicated in bold text while text in italics indicates the round in which those seeds were eliminated. The top four seeded teams received byes into the second round.

Draw

Final

Top half

Bottom half

References

Doubles